"Coming Down" is the debut single by ex-Coronation Street star Richard Fleeshman. It was released on November 19, 2007, and it peaked at #78 on the UK Singles Chart. Despite claims that the song references an episode in which Fleeshman's character saved a young child from a well, he maintains the similarities are merely coincidence.

Track listing
 "Coming Down"
 "Sum of Us"

Chart performance

References

External links
 Official artist website
 Official record label website

2007 singles
2007 songs
Songs written by Steve Robson
Songs written by Sheppard Solomon